Ellen Marie Elze Anthing Vogel (26 January 1922 – 5 August 2015) was a Dutch film, stage and television actress.

Personal

Born on 26 January 1922 in The Hague, Netherlands as the second child of publicist Louis Albert Anthing Vogel (1874–1933) and Ellen Buwalda (1890-1985), Her older sister Pauline Berthe Theodore "Tanja" Anthing Vogel (1919–1997) was the owner of a ballet studio in Wassenaar, and her younger brother, Albert Theodore Leonard Carel Anthing Vogel Jr. (1924-1982), was an actor.

In 1942, aged 20, Vogel married Hans Jürgen Tobi (born 16 April 1916 in Dortmund, German Empire) they had one son Peter Paul Tobi (born 2 October 1946). The couple divorced in October 1949, Hans Jürgen Tobi died on 18 April 2000 in Gorssel, Netherlands, aged 84. Vogel later remarried to Dutch filmmaker and actor Fons Rademakers from 1953-57. In 1976, she married, thirdly, to Jimmy Münninghoff (25 September 1925, Riga – 7 June 2012, Amsterdam).

Ellen Vogel died on 5 August 2015 in Amsterdam at the age of 93.

Filmography

Awards and honours 
 Knight of the Order of the Crown (Belgium, 1959) 
 Knight of the Order of the Netherlands Lion (Netherlands, 1995)

References

External links

 

1922 births
2015 deaths
Dutch film actresses
Dutch television actresses
Dutch stage actresses
Knights of the Order of the Crown (Belgium)
Knights of the Order of the Netherlands Lion
Actresses from The Hague
Actresses from Amsterdam
20th-century Dutch actresses